1878 was the 92nd season of cricket in England since the foundation of the Marylebone Cricket Club (MCC). The first official tour by an Australian team was undertaken, although it played no Test matches. A match at Old Trafford inspired a famous poem.

Champion County

 Undecided

Playing record (by county)

Leading batsmen (qualification 20 innings)

Leading bowlers (qualification 1,000 balls)

Notable events

 Australia made the inaugural first-class tour of England by an overseas team.
 25 – 27 July:  Lancashire versus Gloucestershire at Old Trafford.  This was the first time Gloucestershire visited Old Trafford and it caused ground records to be established.  The match was drawn after rain interruptions.  It has a special place because it ultimately formed the nostalgic inspiration for the famous poem At Lord's by Francis Thompson.  In the second innings, the famed "run-stealers" A. N. Hornby and Dick Barlow shared an opening stand of 108, with Hornby going on to score 100.  He also became involved in a ferocious argument with WG when a contentious "run-out" was claimed after the batsmen had stopped running because the ball had crossed the boundary.  The run-out was finally overruled after WG even went so far as to ask the (Lancashire home) crowd if it had been a four after all.  He knew all along that a four had been scored.
 4 July: Allan Steel becomes the first bowler to take 100 wickets in his first full season of first-class cricket. He played one match in 1877.
 31 July:  Official formation of Northants County Cricket Club at a meeting in the George Hotel, Kettering.
 Alfred Shaw and Fred Morley bowl unchanged through five matches during the season. No other pair has ever managed more than three.
 Shaw becomes the second bowler after James Southerton in 1870 to top 200 wickets in a season.

See also
 W. G. Grace in the 1878 English cricket season
 MCC v Australians at Lord's, 27 May 1878

Notes
An unofficial seasonal title sometimes proclaimed by consensus of media and historians prior to December 1889 when the official County Championship was constituted.  Although there are ante-dated claims prior to 1873, when residence qualifications were introduced, it is only since that ruling that any quasi-official status can be ascribed.
Middlesex, Nottinghamshire and Yorkshire were all seen as having some claims to the "Championship", but the general consensus was that none of these teams could claim superiority

References

Annual reviews
 John Lillywhite's Cricketer's Companion (Green Lilly), Lillywhite, 1879
 James Lillywhite's Cricketers' Annual (Red Lilly), Lillywhite, 1879
 John Wisden's Cricketers' Almanack 1879

External links
 CricketArchive – season summaries

1878 in English cricket
English cricket seasons in the 19th century